Babaroga, LLC. (usually styled babaroga) is a Chicago, Illinois-based video game developer specializing in iOS, Windows, Android, and Feature Phone games. The company has created many licensed games for publishers such as Electronic Arts, and Disney Interactive, as well as original titles with publishers such as Microsoft and Glu.

Babaroga, LLC., provides engineering and design services to the video game industry. The company's focus is to create content on mobile, hand-held and console platforms.

History

In 2002 Babaroga was founded by owner and CEO, Andreja Djokovic in Chicago, IL.

In the early days of the company, Babaroga focused primarily on creating games for feature phones, establishing a foothold in a new and emerging sector of portable gaming. Babaroga forged relationships with various publishers such as Jamdat, Gameloft, Electronic Arts, Disney Interactive to release over 50 feature phone games.

In 2007, when smartphones were introduced, Babaroga adapted its existing technology to support cross-platform development on new mobile operating systems, including iOS and later Android and Windows Phone 7. Babaroga partnered with Microsoft, EA, Glu, and other publishers to create licensed games on smartphones, while also self-publishing original IP.

In 2008, Babaroga partnered with Microsoft to release original games on the Zune and Zune HD platforms. This relationship grew to include working with Microsoft as a first-party and third-Party developer to create new and original games on the Windows 8 and Windows Phone platform, which includes PC, Tablet, and Windows Phone 8 markets.

In 2010, Babaroga expanded its operation to include additional offices in London, UK.

In 2011, Babaroga announced that the Twilight Creations board game adaptation of Zombies!!! would be brought to life on Windows Phone 7, Windows Phone 8, Windows 8, and iOS devices.

Babaroga holds a multi-genre product portfolio with titles such as Jet-Set Scratch-Off, Lucky Lanes Bowling, Horror Master Trivia, Rogue Racing, Decoder Ring, Shuffle Party and Big Fish Fairway Solitaire.

iOS Games

Decoder Ring Gold
Wordament
Deal or No Deal
1 vs 100
Rogue Racing
EA Sports MMA
Horror Master Trivia
Babaroga Eats Children
Zombies!!!
Jet-Set Scratch-Off
Lucky Lanes Bowling
Decoder Ring
Ultimate Party
House
Tattoo Me
Manchester United Pro Skills
Spore Origins
Spore Creatures

Windows 8 Games
Zombies!!!
Wordament
Shuffle Party

Windows Phone 7 Games
Zombies!!!
Shuffle Party
Minesweeper
Sudoku
Bug Village
Monopoly
Need For Speed
The Sims 3

Feature Phone games 
Tetris
Spore: Origins
Transformers: Dark of the Moon
My Sims
Plantasia
SimCity
Tiger Woods PGA Tour 09
House
Downtown Texas Hold'em
Disney's Hannah Montana In Action
Counter Terrorist Academy
The Godfather
Pictionary
Manchester United Pro Skills
Muppets Puzzle Party
Downtown Roulette
Merv Griffin's Crosswords
Paradise Pet Salon
Konstruxis
Jamdat Bowling
Jamdat Hearts
Splinter Cell: Pandora Tomorrow
Jamdat Air Hockey
Spore Creatures
Bees!
Downtown Video Slots
Meet the Robinsons
Jamdat Sports Pool
Tony Hawk's Pro Skater 4
National Lampoon's Greek Games
Gameloft 1000 Words
Strip Off at the Krystal Pistol
Kelly Slater's Pro Surfer
Jamdat Mini Golf
Jamdat Sports Quarterback Showdown

Zune games 
Space Battle
Space Battle 2
Lucky Lanes Bowling
BEES!

Awards
2009 Academy of Interactive Arts & Sciences, Mobile Game of the Year (Spore: Origins)
2009 IGN, Mobile Game of the Year (Spore: Origins)
2008 Pocket Gamer, Gold Award (Spore: Origins)
2008 Pocket Gamer, Silver Award (Spore: Creatures)
2006 Game Developers Conference, Code:Moto Competition winner (Konstruxis)

References

External links

Gamasutra profile

Companies established in 2002
Video game companies of the United States
Video game development companies
Companies based in Chicago
2002 establishments in Illinois